Discover Financial Services is an American financial services company that owns and operates Discover Bank, an online bank that offers checking and savings accounts, personal loans, home equity loans, student loans and credit cards. It also owns and operates the Discover and Pulse networks, and owns Diners Club International. Discover Card is the third largest credit card brand in the United States, when measured by cards in force, with nearly 50 million cardholders. Discover is currently headquartered in the Chicago suburb of Riverwoods, Illinois.

History
In 1981, Sears purchased the Dean Witter Reynolds brokerage firm organization and Coldwell, Banker & Company (real estate franchise) as an attempt to add financial services to its portfolio of customer services. In 1985, Sears also acquired the Greenwood Trust Company. Altogether, these companies operated as a Sears subsidiary called Dean Witter Financial Services Group, Inc. The plan to create a one-stop financial-services center in Sears stores was not as successful as Sears had hoped. Its credit card operations accounted for a loss of $22 million in the fourth quarter of 1986, and a loss of $25.8 million in the first quarter of 1987.

On March 1, 1993, Sears sold off its financial services branch as a new independent publicly traded company called Dean Witter, Discover & Co. with Dean Witter Reynolds in charge. This company had a stock ticker symbol of DWD.

In 1995, Discover Card Services, Inc. changed its name to NOVUS Services, Inc. to distinguish its network functions from the Discover Card.

In 1997, this company merged with investment banking house Morgan Stanley to become Morgan Stanley Dean Witter, Discover & Co.

On February 1, 1999, the company rebranded itself as Discover Financial Services, Inc. The NOVUS logo was retired, replaced by the Discover Network logo.

In April 2005, Morgan Stanley announced that it would divest Discover Financial Services as an independent company within six months. By June, industry sources reported that Morgan Stanley was reassessing its plan to spin off Discover. In August, the company confirmed it would not sell Discover. However, on December 19, 2006, during a fourth quarter earnings report, Morgan Stanley CEO John J. Mack announced Discover would be spun off as a standalone publicly traded company by the end of August 2007, stating that both companies will be better positioned for growth and success as separate entities. Ahead of schedule on June 30, 2007, Discover was spun off as an independent, publicly traded company. It began trading on the NYSE for the first time on July 2 as DFS.

Acquisitions

Acquisition of The Greenwood Trust Company
The Greenwood Trust Company was founded on August 30, 1911, and was based in Greenwood, Delaware. It was acquired in 1985 and renamed Discover Bank on August 1, 2000. Discover Bank is mainly an online financial institution that offers many financial services such as checking accounts, savings accounts, and money market accounts. However the first and original location of the Greenwood Trust Company on 502 East Market Street is still operating and is the only physical banking location of Discover Bank. Discover Bank operates as a subsidiary of Discover Financial Services and is FDIC insured.

Acquisition of Pulse
In 2005, Discover Financial Services acquired Pulse, an interbank electronic funds transfer payments network. This allowed Pulse and its more than 4,000 member banks, credit unions, and savings institutions to join with the Discover Network's 4 million merchant and cash access locations. Additionally DFS now had the ability to market and issue debit and ATM cards. On February 13, 2006, DFS announced that it would begin offering Discover debit cards to other financial institutions, becoming the first credit card services company to compete directly with MasterCard and Visa in the rapidly growing signature debit market.

Acquisition of Diners Club International
In April 2008, Discover Financial and Citigroup announced that Discover was purchasing the Diners Club International network from Citigroup for $165 million. In May 2008, the Federal Trade Commission approved the transaction and it was finalized on July 1, 2008. Discover stated that the Diners Club network, which is a major network outside the United States, will be merged with the Discover Network, a major network in the United States. The creation of an international network for Discover and Diners Club cardholders allowed customers to expand their global reach. Diners Club cards will continue to be issued by Diners Club International licensees. At this time, Discover Bank has no plans on issuing Diners Club branded cards itself.

Acquisition of Student Loan Corporation
On September 17, 2010, Discover Financial Services announced it would acquire Citigroup-owned Student Loan Corporation for $30/share. The deal was finalized on December 31, renamed Discover Student Loans, and expanded DFS's market presence and origination capabilities in private student loans. In 2014, DFS launched Rewards for Good Grades, rewarding college and graduate students who get at least a 3.0 GPA (or equivalent) a one-time cash reward equal to 1% of the loan amount on each new Discover student loan. In 2015, DFS introduced an interactive tool called FAFSA assistant to help students and their families get ready to complete the FAFSA. The tool provides individualized tips and guidance based on personal situations.

Acquisition of Home Loan Center
On June 6, 2012, Tree.com, Inc. completed the sale of substantially all of the operating assets of its Home Loan Center, Inc. business to a wholly owned subsidiary of Discover Financial. In exchange for the assets sold, Discover paid an aggregate of $45.9 million including payments made prior to the closing which were applied to the closing price.  On June 12, 2012, Discover began originating mortgages with its launch of Discover Home Loans, offering prime variable- and fixed-rate conventional and FHA home mortgage loans. The Home Loans business was later sold in 2015.

Business developments 
In 1989, Discover Network signs its 1 millionth merchant, a restaurant called Vincente's Restaurant in Wilmington, Delaware.

In 1995, DiscoverCard.com was launched where consumers could apply for credit cards, pay bills, redeem rewards, receive email reminders, and earn extra rewards through online retail partners.

On December 22, 1998, the company introduced Discover Platinum, a premium card featuring new ways to increase rewards, low balance transfer and annual percentage rates, no annual fee, and expanded credit lines.

On December 21, 2001, fourth-quarter income at Discover grew 31% to $193 million, compared with $147 million the year before.

In 2002, Discover launched the industry's first keychain credit card. It was named the Discover 2GO Card and was recognized as one of the "Best Products of 2002" by editors and reporters from Business Week and USA Today.

On March 5, 2002, the company announced that the Account Center at Discovercard.com had registered over eight million card members, an increase of 61% since January 2001.

On September 1, 2002, Discover announced that Citibank would accept the Discover® Card for cash advances at its approximately 450 Financial Centers and more than 2,000 ATM locations nationwide.

In 2003, Discover introduced gas and miles rewards cards. The Gasoline Card (renamed Open Road in 2007) awarded 5% Cashback Bonus on gas purchases. The Miles Card by Discover card allowed redemption with as little as 2,500 miles for non-flight reward options. Discover also introduced the option for paperless statements to minimize the impact on the environment and reduce clutter for customers.

In October 2004, the Supreme Court upheld a ruling in Discover's favor that challenged exclusionary policies of Visa and MasterCard, stating that Mastercard and Visa were violating antitrust regulations with anticompetitive practices. Before this ruling, Visa and MasterCard would not allow banks to issue a Discover or American Express card if they issued a Visa or MasterCard. Within days of the court ruling, Discover filed a lawsuit in federal court seeking damages from Visa and MasterCard. In October 2008, DFS was awarded $2.75 billion in damages, the third largest settlement at the time in U.S. history. Shortly after the Supreme Court ruling, Discover struck its first deal to have its cards issued by another financial institution, GE Consumer Finance, which began to issue credit cards for retailer Walmart and its wholesale warehouse stores, Sam's Club. Transactions were processed on the Discover Network. Sam's Club exclusively accepted Discover for many years; since November 2006, it has also accepted MasterCard for purchases. In April 2014, Walmart announced that they were ending their relationship with Discover and would begin converting all Discover-branded cards to Mastercard beginning in June 2014.

HSBC has issued Discover-branded credit cards processed through the Discover Network since its acquisition of card issuer Metris in late 2005. Metris had originally signed an agreement with Discover in September 2005, three months prior to the HSBC acquisition.

In 2006, Discover Network united with Visa, MasterCard, American Express, and JCB to form the Payment Card Industry (PCI) Security Standards Council, which helps to manage the ongoing payment account security throughout the transaction process. In this same year, DFS also launched the Discover Business Card, offering a single payment solution for small business owners. On July 14, 2006, DFS and First Data Corp., a global leader in electronic commerce and payment services, announced that First Data would offer Discover Network card services to small- and mid-sized merchants.

On March 13, 2007, Discover Financial Services announced the Discover Motiva card, the credit card that gives cardmembers cash rewards for making six on-time monthly payments in a row. This card was the industry's first credit card to give cash rewards for good credit management. Later in the year, DFS announced the Discover More card to replace the Discover Platinum card. The Discover More card was designed for consumers who use credit in many different categories and provided them with more ways to earn cash back on their purchases.

Following the 2007–08 financial crisis, Discover received about $1.2 billion in bailout funds under the Troubled Asset Relief Program (TARP). The company announced in 2010 that it had received approval to pay back the funds.

In 2009, Discover Financial Services introduced the Spend Analyzer tool, an innovative easy-to-use online tool that provides cardmembers with a visual representation of their Discover card purchases for the past 24 months.

In 2010, Discover Financial Services and Softcard announced a strategic partnership to build a mobile payment network that utilizes mobile phones to make point-of-sale purchases.

In September 2012, Discover Financial Services was ordered to pay over $200 million in fines and customer reimbursements to settle accusations by U.S. federal regulators that it had engaged in deceptive telemarketing tactics.

In 2012, Discover Financial Services announced a five year, $10 million commitment called Pathway to Financial Success to help bring financial education curriculum to public high schools across the U.S.

In 2013, Discover Financial Services and PayPal partnered to enable millions of participating merchants to accept PayPal easily through their existing relationship with Discover. In the same year, Discover Cashback Checking was introduced. This checking account product paid customers 10 cents for every debit card purchase, online bill payment, and check written. Additionally in this same year, the Discover it card was announced. The card rewards cardmembers with 5% cash back in rotating categories each quarter like gas and restaurants. Discover also introduced Discover Home Equity Loans, offering homeowners the opportunity to simplify their finances inclusive of supporting home improvement projects, paying for major expenses, or consolidating debt into a single, fixed monthly payment. Discover also became the first major credit card issuer to provide free access to FICO Credit Scores based on TransUnion data directly to its cardmembers on their monthly statements. Additional information provided with their FICO Credit Scores were educational content to help them better understand their scores.

In 2014, Discover Financial Services launched Discover it Chrome for Students, allowing students to establish credit while earning 2% at gas stations and restaurants.

In 2015, Discover Financial Services launched Discover it Miles, which rewards 1.5 miles per dollar spent.

In 2016, Discover Financial Services launched Discover it Secured for consumers looking to build their credit. Additionally, DFS expanded FICO Credit Scores based on Experian data for free to everyone via a platform called Credit Scorecard, which also included a summary of the data that helps determine an individual's FICO Credit Score.

In 2017, Discover Financial Services launched a free service called Discover Identity Alerts to notify cardmembers if their social security numbers are found on risky websites and if any new accounts are opened on their Experian credit report. All of these services are offered at no cost and do not impact credit scores.

In 2018, Discover Financial Services announced a change to its checking account rewards program, a new industry-leading reward of 1% cash back on up to $3,000 in qualifying debit card purchases each month. Additionally DFS also introduced First Fee Forgiveness, a new program that automatically waives the first eligible fee each calendar year for certain Discover accounts. Eligible fees included in the program were inclusive of insufficient funds, stop payment, excessive withdrawal and Money Market minimum balance fees. For its U.S.-based employees, DFS launched the Discover College Commitment, which offers employees a full ride bachelor's degree program covering tuition, required fees, books, and supplies to select online degrees. On September 12, DFS launched the Discover it Business credit card, offering unlimited 1.5% cash back on all purchases, as well as free business and security features.

In 2019, Discover Financial Services' subsidiary Discover Bank eliminated most fees on all of its deposit products. Additionally, Discover Home Equity Loans surpassed $1 billion in funded loans, helping over 20,000 homeowners with their financial goals. DFS also launched contactless cards this year.

In 2021, Discover Bank originated 14,148 mortgages worth $1.3 billion.

Discover Global Network 

Discover Financial Services has 3 payment systems that make up its Discover Global Network: Discover Network, Diners Club International, and Pulse. Since 2005, to increase acceptance of its payment cards around the world, Discover has formed several agreements with other payment networks internationally. This allows Discover cardholders to perform transactions while traveling abroad. Vice versa, cardholders of other countries may utilize their cards at U.S. merchants and financial institutions that accept Discover.

Some major credit and debit partners include:
Diners Club International worldwide
BC Card in South Korea
JCB in Japan
UnionPay in China
DinaCard in Serbia
Elo in Brazil
Mercury in the United Arab Emirates
RuPay in India
Troy in Turkey
Verve in Nigeria
Some major debit partners include:
AFS in the Middle East and North Africa region
Areeba in Lebanon
ATH in Puerto Rico
Bcard in Bulgaria
Cabal in Argentina, Uruguay, Paraguay, and Brazil
Dutch-Bangla Bank in Bangladesh
Eazy in Bahrain
Interac in Canada
Jonet in Jordan
NAPAS in Vietnam
NCCC in Taiwan
PayNet in Malaysia
Prosa in Mexico
Saudi Payments in Saudi Arabia
SIBS with 10 countries in Europe and Africa

With these and many other global partnerships, Discover is accepted in 200+ countries and territories.

Advertising 
From 1998 to 2007, Discover Card owned a billboard at One Times Square, just above the flagpole where the Times Square Ball is placed, until Toshiba bought the space. As a result, its logo could be seen on national television during New Year's Eve, while the ball dropped. Discover also sponsored the ball drop itself.

From its opening in 2001 to 2012, Sugarloaf Mills Mall in Lawrenceville, Georgia, was named Discover Mills in a naming rights partnership with Discover Card. The slogan for the mall was "Where Discover Card is the Smart Choice." It was the first shopping mall to have granted naming rights to interested companies.

Since 2008, Discover has been the official credit-card partner of the National Hockey League. As part of this deal, Discover offers team- and league-branded credit cards as well as a 10% discount on purchases made from the NHL's online store using Discover.

In 2011 and 2012, Discover participated and won the Grand Marshal award for excellence in creative concept and design in the Tournament of Roses Parade in Pasadena.

From 2011 to 2013, Discover was the sponsor of the college football Orange Bowl.

In 2013, Discover was the sponsor of the BCS National Championship.

In 2017, Discover was named the first ever presenting sponsor and official credit card of the Big Ten Football Conference and Championship Game as part of a multi-year sponsorship.

Business
In addition to its card products, Discover Financial Services also markets savings products, checking accounts, personal loans, student loans, identity protection, and home equity loans.

Competitors
In the United States, Discover, as a card network, competes primarily with Visa, MasterCard, and American Express. Unlike Visa and MasterCard, Discover directly issues its cards as both the card network and associated bank, through its Discover Bank unit. When measured by card balances, Discover is the sixth largest credit card issuer in the U.S. behind JPMorgan Chase, Citigroup, Bank of America, Capital One and American Express, and ahead of Wells Fargo and U.S. Bank.

References

External links 

 Discover Financial Services official corporate site
 Discover all services official site
 Discover Network official merchant, acquirer, and issuer services site

 
American companies established in 1985
Companies based in Lake County, Illinois
Companies listed on the New York Stock Exchange
Corporate spin-offs
Credit card issuer associations
Financial services companies established in 1985
Financial services companies of the United States
Online banks
Riverwoods, Illinois